The Homecare Association is the trade organization for providers of home care in the United Kingdom.  It was established in 1989.

It provides various services to its members, such as technical advice, a Homecare Workers' Handbook, insurance and criminal record checks and advice about legislation, such as the Care Act 2014.

It acts as a lobbying organization for the industry.  A survey of members in October 2015 found 11% of all providers thought that they would "definitely" or "probably" have ceased trading within the next year.  Freedom of Information requests to all 211 councils – or health and care trusts in Northern Ireland – responsible for funding home care found that only 28 paid a "minimum price" of £15.74 an hour which was sufficient to fund staff at the National Minimum Wage.

Bridget Warr, the chief executive of the association, was involved in drawing up the guidelines for staffing and home visits by the National Institute for Health and Care Excellence in September 2015, though she expressed doubts whether members could afford to meet them. The association was particularly concerned about the impact of the National Living Wage. It predicted a £750 million shortfall in funding for homecare services in 2016–17.

The industry suffers from severe shortages of staff.  The association argues for the government  "to invest properly in homecare so we can build capacity and reduce unmet need".  They say  “poor commissioning practices” by local authorities and the NHS were driving low pay.  "Many homecare workers are not paid if, for example, the person they are supporting is admitted to hospital, or if they have to isolate after a positive COVID-19 test result.”

References

External links
 Homecare Association

Social care in the United Kingdom
Health care industry trade groups based in the United Kingdom